, now known in its fourth iteration as Casiopea-P4, is a Japanese jazz fusion band formed in 1976 by guitarist Issei Noro, bassist Tetsuo Sakurai, drummer Tohru "Rika" Suzuki, and keyboardist Hidehiko Koike. In 1977, keyboardist Minoru Mukaiya and drummer Takashi Sasaki (ja) joined, replacing Koike and Suzuki. They recorded their debut album Casiopea (1979) with guest appearances by American jazz musicians Randy Brecker, Michael Brecker, and David Sanborn. In 1980, drummer Akira Jimbo joined the band. Casiopea had released over 40 albums in Japan and around the world.

Starting from 2012, they formed Casiopea 3rd as a spin-off from the original, featuring Kiyomi Otaka on keyboards and returning members, Issei Noro, Akira Jimbo, and Yoshihiro Naruse.

On July 1, 2022, it was announced that Yoshinori Imai would be the band's new drummer after Akira Jimbo left Casiopea 3rd, and the band would be rebranded as Casiopea-P4.

History

Casiopea 1st (1976–1989)

One of the band's earliest appearances was at Yamaha's amateur band contest "EastWest '76" (ja), featuring Issei Noro, Tetsuo Sakurai, Hidehiko Koike, and Tohru "Rika" Suzuki. This was Casiopea's original formation, and both Koike and Suzuki left the band due to being busy with other projects at the time (Suzuki joining Prism, and Koike in other bands). They finally got their first permanent formation when Takashi Sasaki replaced Suzuki on Drums and Minoru Mukaiya replaced Koike on Keyboards in 1977. They would re-appear in the "YAMAHA EastWest '77" contest at this time, and they later made their official live debut in January 1978. Around this time, musicians like Prism guitarist Akira Wada, keyboardist Jun Fukamachi, guitarist Kenji Omura and others in the Japanese Fusion scene frequently appeared with the band as supporting members/special guests in some of their live performances (with their appearances ranging from 1977 to 1979, and 1980 for some). The first label to sign them was Alfa Records, which released their album Casiopea, which was released in May 1979, featuring the Brecker brothers and David Sanborn as the brass section. They would also release the album Super Flight later that same year. After the end of the Super Flight tour in January 1980, Sasaki also left the band and Akira Jimbo would fill the drummer seat in the following month. "Galactic Funk" appeared on their 1981 album Cross Point (1981) with ten different versions recorded both live and in studio. The album Eyes of the Mind was released in the United States in 1981. They then released Mint Jams (1982), followed during the same year by 4x4, which was recorded with Lee Ritenour, Harvey Mason, Nathan East, and Don Grusin. The band's first overseas concert was in the United Kingdom in 1983. The band has toured Europe, South America, Australia, and Southeast Asia. In 1987, Casiopea signed to Polydor. In 1989, Akira Jimbo and Tetsuo Sakurai, who played drums and bass, respectively, as part of the first "Classic Lineup" of Casiopea, split and recruited other musicians, including city pop singers Yurie Kokubu (ja) and Kaoru Akimoto (ja), to form Shambara (ja) the same year. The band dissolved after releasing one album, and the two formed the duo Jimsaku in 1990.

Casiopea 2nd (1990–2006)

With only Issei Noro and Minoru Mukaiya remaining from the original Casiopea lineup, bassist Yoshihiro Naruse and drummer Masaaki Hiyama joined the band, replacing both Sakurai and Jimbo. Casiopea then signed to Pioneer. In August 1992, Hiyama left the band due to health issues, and drummer Noriaki Kumagai replaced him later that year, first appearing in the album Dramatic in 1993, and the band returned to the Alfa label that year, then to Pony Canyon. In 1997, Jimbo returned as a part-time member, recording more albums and writing compositions. This would become Casiopea's longest running line-up in the band's history (guitarist Issei Noro, keyboardist Minoru Mukaiya, and bassist Yoshihiro Naruse, with drummers Masaaki Hiyama from 1990 to 1992, Noriaki Kumagai from 1993 to 1996, and the returning Akira Jimbo from 1997 to 2006).

In 2000, the band again signed to Pioneer, who would release their 20th Anniversary album (featuring Noro, Mukaiya, Jimbo and Naruse, with returning members consisting of Kumagai, Koike, and Sakurai). Four years later Pioneer changed its name to Geneon Entertainment. On August 1, 2006, Issei Noro, the group's leader, decided to freeze all activities of the band until further notice. In 2007, Noro and Jimbo formed the fusion band Inspirits.

In January 2009, Casiopea participated in the album Tetsudou Seminar Ongakuhen, based on Minoru Mukaiya's Train Simulator video games.

On May 27, 2009, a limited-edition box set, Legend of Casiopea, was released to commemorate the band's thirtieth anniversary.

Casiopea 3rd (2012–2022)
On April 20, 2012, the formation of Casiopea 3rd was announced with Kiyomi Otaka joining on keyboards, replacing Minoru Mukaiya, who led his own music production team Mukaiya Club.

During the 2010 decade Casiopea 3rd resumed album releases, and both Casiopea 3rd and Inspirits held a joint concert as a result of having a common bandleader in Issei Noro.

During the COVID-19 crisis, Issei Noro released a song titled A•RI•GA•TO (Appreciation), thanking all those on the frontlines.

On February 10, 2022, Akira Jimbo announced he will be leaving Casiopea 3rd. His final appearance with Casiopea 3rd was during the April and May 2022 Billboard Tour.

Casiopea-P4 (2022–present)
On July 1, 2022, Issei Noro announced on the band's website that Yoshinori Imai will be the new drummer, and the band would rebrand to Casiopea-P4. The Recording Session for the first of Casiopea-P4 albums started, weeks after the rebrand.

Offshoot bands

Ottottrio
In 1987, T-Square members Masahiro Andoh (guitarist) and Hiroyuki Noritake (drummer), Issei Noro and current KORENOS guitarist Hirokuni Korekata created a supergroup called Ottottrio. With a backing band composed by keyboardists Chizuko Yoshihiro and Shotoku Sasaji, and bassist Chiharu Mikuzuki, the group released 3 albums, 2 in 1988 and one called "Triptych" in 1998. In 1989, Ottottrio performed on the joint event "The Super Fusion", with all members of T-Square and Casiopea respectively, as well as Ottottrio's backing players.

Casiopea vs. The Square
After Ottottrio, the relationship between Casiopea and T-Square continued in 1993, when former T-Square percussionist Kiyohiko Senba played on one of the songs from Casiopea's album "Dramatic", and, a year later, the bands played together an arrangement of The Beatles "Get Back" on a Japanese Broadcast. In 1997, Casiopea, T-Square and Jimsaku played at Tokyo Jam, and in 2003 both groups played (with some of the players replaced), at the event Casiopea vs. The Square itself. More recently they still have somewhat of an alliance, seeing as Casiopea's former drummer Noriaki Kumagai and T-Square's former bassist Mitsuru Sutoh both in group TRIX, and T-Square Sax/EWI player Takeshi Itoh performance with Casiopea's former keyboardist Minoru Mukaiya in 2006.

Synchronized DNA
In 2005, Akira Jimbo and Hiroyuki Noritake created a Drum Duo called Synchronized DNA, who played in a tour with Casiopea, released as "Casiopea + Sync DNA: 5 Stars Live", and in their last album before hiatus, "Signal".

Inspirits
In 2008, Issei Noro created the band Issei Noro Inspirits, with Akira Jimbo, pianist Kent Ohgiya, keyboardist Ryo Hayashi and bassist Yuji Yajima as members. As of September 8, 2018, they have released five studio albums, one live album, and one live DVD.

Pegasus
In 2009, a director from Tetsuo Sakurai's record company suggested him to make an album for the 30th anniversary of his career, released as My Dear Musiclife. Sakurai accepted his idea but the director asked him to record "Domino Line" in it, as he played that song as Casiopea's Bassist (throughout 1979 to 1990). Sakurai asked the writer of that song, Issei Noro, for permission. Noro answered OK but he said he wouldn't take part in recording. Instead, Noro and Sakurai recorded a new song in Acoustic Arrangement, called "Mirage".

After that, Noro and Sakurai went on a domestic club tour as an acoustic guitar duo, called Pegasus.

Katsushika Trio
Keyboardist Minoru Mukaiya, Bassist Tetsuo Sakurai and Drummer Akira Jimbo, all former Casiopea Members, formed the "Katsushika Trio" in 2021. They held concerts throughout 2021 playing their classic Casiopea hits. Their first completely new song, "Red Express" was released on June 29th, 2022.

Members

Guitar
Issei Noro (1976–2006, 2012–present)
 The leader of Casiopea and "Issei Noro Inspirits". He has also been part of "Pegasus" with fellow ex-Casiopea bassist Tetsuo Sakurai.
Kenji Omura (1977–1979, as Live Support Member)
 Met the Casiopea members around 1977, and appeared as an extra member in a fair number of their live shows from that time (and even collaborating with Noro, Naruse and Wada in non-Casiopea albums) until late 1979. He would later join Yellow Magic Orchestra afterwards.
Akira Wada (1978–1980 (as Live Support Member), 1997 as Special Guest)
Since both Prism and Casiopea arrived to the Japanese Fusion scene during its boom in the 70s, both bands became friends. He, Noro and Omura appeared in Shuichi Murakami's album Tokyo Fusion Night in 1978. As a result, he would also appear in many of the band's live performances from the time of their live debut until mid-1980. He returned one more time as a special guest during a tour with Casiopea and Tetsuo Sakurai in 1997, and in 2015, both Casiopea 3rd and Prism collaborated in a crossover special.
Katsutoshi Morizono (1980, as Special Guest)
 Popular session guitarist that also participated in a few Casiopea sessions as an extra support member. It is unknown if he appeared with them at any time prior to 1980.

Keyboards
Hidehiko Koike (1976–1977)
Played with Casiopea in their first small-time gigs, but left the group after Casiopea played in Yamaha's music contest "EastWest '76" due to already being active in other bands. He didn't record an album with Casiopea until his appearance in their 20th Anniversary concert in 1999.
Minoru Mukaiya (1977–2006)
Although Mukaiya was the replacement of Hidehiko Koike, he is considered Casiopea's original keyboardist, since Koike never recorded an album with the band. Since 1985, Minoru Mukaiya has been the Chief Executive Officer of Ongakukan, a company which was originally for recording equipment, but now makes video games (mainly train simulators, such as the titular series Train Simulator). In 1993, A Japanese Macintosh game was released and made by Ongakukan, called "Touch the Music with Casiopea". Most likely, the sound director and music sequencer was Minoru Mukaiya himself. He is currently the producer and founder of Mukaiya Club.
Jun Fukamachi (1978–1979, as Live Support Member)
Played in some of Casiopea's shows from the time of their live debut until 1979, and is best known for his solo career and tenure in the Japanese fusion band  Prism. He was also in charge of the arrangements in Casiopea's first two albums.
Kiyomi Otaka (2012–present)
Kiyomi Otaka is the only female member of Casiopea. She is one of the two members that had a well-established solo career before joining the group (having been a solo recording artist since 1998). Unlike Mukaiya, she originally started as an organ player, rather than using synthesizers.

Bass
Tetsuo Sakurai (1976–1989)
Casiopea's original Bassist. He and Akira Jimbo left in 1989 to form the drum/bass duo known as Jimsaku (the name is a combination of both member's names, as in "Jimbo and Sakurai".) Sakurai also is the other half of acoustic guitar duo Pegasus, mentioned above.
Yoshihiro Naruse (1977–1979 (as Live Support) and 1980–1989 (in other crossovers), 1990–2006, 2012–present)
Known to his fans as "Narucho", he is the other member that had an established solo career before joining the band. According to Yamaha's "Event Archives", he was one of the judges of EastWest '77. One of his first solo albums, "Bass Bawl", features Tetsuo Sakurai on a song called "Captain Chaos".

Drums
Tohru "Rika" Suzuki (1976–1977)
Played during their small-time gigs in Yamaha's "EastWest '76" concert. He left afterwards to record with the band Prism (ja) and was replaced by Takashi Sasaki in 1977. However, he would perform with them in crossover shows (likely when the rest of Prism was involved) in 1979, and perform with Noro, Mukaiya and Naruse in a Christmas album called Superman Santa in 1986.
Takashi Sasaki (ja) (1977–1979)
The replacement of Tohru Suzuki, though he is mostly considered the band's original drummer. It is rumored that he left the group because he was used to playing complicated rhythms, and Casiopea's sound was becoming too smooth for his style.
 Shuichi "Ponta" Murakami (1977–1979, as Live Support Member)
 Occasionally appeared as a second drummer for the band in a few of their live performances. He was also a famous session drummer in Japan with a well known solo career.
Akira Jimbo (1980–1989, 1997–2006, 2012–2022 (as Special Support))
 Casiopea's longest-tenured drummer, he was a full-time member from 1980 to 1989, when he and Tetsuo Sakurai left the group to form Jimsaku. He returned in 1997 and stayed almost a decade in Casiopea. Since 2012, he is a special support drummer for the band. Apart from Casiopea, he also plays drums for Issei Noro's backing band Inspirits and for the Nettai Tropical Jazz Big Band. On February 10, 2022, Akira Jimbo announced he will be leaving Casiopea 3rd. His final appearance with Casiopea 3rd was during the April and May 2022 Billboard Tour. 
Masaaki Hiyama (1990–1992)
Joined the group and replaced Akira Jimbo. He left the band because of medical problems.
Noriaki Kumagai (1993–1996)
Replaced Masaaki Hiyama and played as a Casiopea member until Akira Jimbo returned to the group. In 2004, he became the drummer for Jazz-Fusion Supergroup TRIX, which features bassist Mitsuru Sutoh (from T-Square), Session Musicians Hiroshi Kubota on keyboard and Takeshi Hirai on Guitar (replaced by electone/piano prodigy Ayaki Saito and guitarist Yuya Komoguchi respectively).
Hiroyuki Noritake
Support drummer between 2005 and 2006, Noritake was once T-Square's first long-tenured drummer (1986–2005). Noritake and Jimbo have performed in Japanese Jazz Fusion concert lineups together (as part of their bands respectively) but were able to collaborate during the "Casiopea vs. The Square" event in 2003. They played as "Synchronized DNA" on Signal, Casiopea's last album before their 2006 dissolution.
Yoshinori Imai (2022-present)
It was announced on the band's website that Imai would be replacing Akira Jimbo as the band's drummer. Imai was previously part of UK Rampage.

Vocals
Yukoh Kusunoki (1986–1987)
 Vocalist in Casiopea that joined during their 10th anniversary tour in 1986, appearing in Casiopea Perfect Live II and  Platinum as well, and left after their "Magical Dancing Tour" at the end of 1987 as a result of the band wanting to return to their instrumental style. He also performed in Issei Noro's band Inspirits.

Timeline

Discography 
Studio albums

Casiopea 1st
 Casiopea (1979)
 Super Flight (1979)
 Make Up City (1980)
 Eyes of the Mind (1981)
 Cross Point (1981)
 4x4 (1982)
 Photographs (1983)
 Jive Jive (1983)
 The Soundgraphy (1984)
 Down Upbeat (1984)
 Halle (1985)
 Sun Sun (1986)
 Platinum (1987)
 Euphony (1988)

Casiopea 2nd
 The Party (1990)
 Full Colors (1991)
 Active (1992)
 Dramatic (1993)
 Answers (1994)
 Hearty Notes (1994)
 Asian Dreamer (1994)
 Freshness (1995)
 Flowers (1996)
 Light and Shadows (1997)
 Be (1998)
 Material (1999)
 Bitter Sweet (2000)
 Main Gate (2001)
 Inspire (2002)
 Places (2003)
 Marble (2004)
 Signal (2005)
 Gentle and Mellow (2006)
 Tetsudou Seminar Ongakuhen (2009)

Casiopea 3rd
 Ta•Ma•Te•Box (2013)
 A•So•Bo (2015)
 I•Bu•Ki (2016)
 Vestige −40th History Album- (2017)
 A•ka•ri (2018)
 Panspermia (2019)
Casiopea-P4
 New Topics (2022)

Live albums

 Thunder Live (1980)
 Mint Jams (1982)
 Casiopea Live (1985)
 Casiopea Perfect Live II (1987)
 Casiopea World Live '88 (1988)

 We Want More (1992)
 Made in Melbourne (1994)
 Live Anthology Fine (1994)
 Live Anthology Fine 2 (1995)
 Work out (1995)
 20th (2000)
 The Mint Session (2004)
 Casiopea vs The Square Live (2004)
 Best Live Selections - Groove & Passion (2006)

 Recorded Live and Best - Early Alfa Years (2012)
 Live Liftoff 2012 (2013)
 TA・MA・TE・BOX TOUR - CASIOPEA 35th Anniversary LIVE CD (2014)
 A・SO・N・DA - LIVE CD (2016)

Radio
A fan-run internet radio called Nonstop Casiopea, created in 2016, streams Casiopea's music.

References

External links 
 
 
 

Musical groups established in 1976
1976 establishments in Japan
Japanese jazz ensembles
Jazz fusion ensembles
Milestone Records artists
Musical groups from Tokyo